List of hospitals in Slovakia is listing the hospitals and important clinics in the Slovak Republic.
Bratislava Region (Bratislavský kraj)
Teaching Hospital with Polyclinic Bratislava
Interklinik Bratislava
St. Michael Hospital, a.s. Bratislava
National Institute of Heart and Cardiovascular Diseases Bratislava
National Institute of Oncology
Children's Teaching Hospital with Policlinic Bratislava
Philipp Pinel Psychiatric Hospital, Pezinok
Trnava Region (Trnavský kraj)
Trenčin Region (Trenčiansky kraj)
Teaching Hospital Trencin
Hospital with Polyclinic Povazska Bystrica
Nitra Region (Nitrianský kraj)
Hospital with Polyclinic Levice
Teaching Hospital Nitra
R. Korec City Hospital Zlate Moravce
Žilina Region (Žilinský kraj) 
Martin University Hospital
Medcentrum Zilina
Liptov Hospital with Policlinic Liptovsky Mikulas
Banska Bystrica Region (Banskobystricky kraj)
F.D. Roosevelt Teaching Hospital with Policlinic Banská Bystrica
Prešov Region (Prešovský kraj) 
Hospital Poprad, a.s.
Hospital with polyclinic Vranov nad Toplou
Jan Adam Reiman Teaching Hospital with Polyclinic Presov
Košice Region (Košický kraj)
Štefan Kukura Hospital in Michalovce
Louis Pasteur Teaching Hospital with Polyclinic in Kosice
Hospital with Policlinic Trebisov, a.s.
Airforce Military Hospital, a.s. Kosice
Hospital Kosice-Saca

References
 Complete list of hospitals in Slovakia by the Health Ministry of Slovak Republic

List
Slovakia
Hospitals
Slovakia